Wan Khara is a town and Union Council of Kasur District in the Punjab province of Pakistan. It is part of Chunian Tehsil and is located at 31°3'0N 73°57'0E with an altitude of 187 metres (616 feet).

References

Kasur District